The Subprefecture of Freguesia-Brasilândia is one of 32 subprefectures of the city of São Paulo, Brazil.  It comprises two districts: Freguesia do Ó and Brasilândia.

References

Subprefectures of São Paulo